P.S. Fashion (stylized as P...S.... fashion) is an international brand from Serbia. It is the flagship chain store of the P.S. Fashion Design, clothing company headquartered in Čačak, Serbia.

History
P.S. Fashion was established in 1996 as small clothing craft, by marital partners Slađana and Predrag Pantović. As of 2008, it was already one of the largest clothing companies in Serbia with monthly production of 25,000 clothing pieces and around 300 employees.

As of 2018, P.S Fashion is one of the largest Serbian clothing companies and one of the largest companies in the city of Čačak.

Social responsibility
P.S. Fashion has sponsored local basketball club KK Borac Čačak which plays in top-tier of Serbia - Basketball League of Serbia. Company's owner and director Predrag Pantović has been the president of the club since December 2017.

See also
 List of supermarket chains in Serbia

References

External links
 
 Serbian Apparel (P.S. Fashion)

1990s fashion
Clothing brands of Serbia
Clothing companies of Serbia
Multinational companies headquartered in Serbia
Companies based in Čačak
Clothing companies established in 1996
D.o.o. companies in Serbia
Serbian brands
Serbian companies established in 1996